Cerium oxide may refer to:

Cerium(III) oxide, Ce2O3, also known as dicerium trioxide
Cerium(III, IV) oxide, Ce3O4 (dark blue)
Cerium(IV) oxide, CeO2, also known as ceric oxide